There are  three types of prison in Turkey: closed, semi-open, and open. A further distinction is made between ordinary closed prisons and high-security prisons. Many prisons have separate blocks (or wings) for women and some also for children (juveniles), but there are also some prisons which are exclusively for women or children. Prisoners in Turkey are divided, as in many other countries, into remand prisoners (those being held in pre-trial detention) and convicted prisoners (whose sentences are being carried out).

History
In the Ottoman Empire prisons were called dungeons (zindan). In Turkey, these were mostly dark and damp towers. The first prison was built in Sultanahmet quarter of Istanbul and it was called general prison (Hapishane-i Umumi).

Besides the death penalty the Penal Code of 1858 included three different types of sentences: rowing on a galley (kürek), pillorying (prangabentlik) and imprisonment in a tower (kalebentlik).

The Penal Code of 1 March 1926 (Law 765) made a difference between heavy crimes and corresponding sentences (ağır suç and ağır ceza) and light crimes (hafif suç and hafif ceza). Besides offences (cürüm) there is a separate law on infringements (kabahat). By Law 5349 dated 11 May 2005 the differentiation between light and heavy sentences was lifted.

Between 1980 to 2000

On 12 September 1980 the military seized power in Turkey and the five generals (General Staff) announced martial law in all of the then existing 67 provinces. Members of armed and unarmed left and right organizations that had been engaged in bitter fighting were charged at military courts and in some places held in military prisons. The military prison Mamak in Ankara, Metris Prison (in Istanbul) and the prison in Diyarbakır (often called dungeon) gained notoriety.

Because of the large number of prisoners new prisons were built. In a report of November 1988, Amnesty International said that the number of prisons had increased to 644 and their capacity had been raised from 55,000 to more than 80,000. Since 1986 relatives of prisoners organized in the Human Rights Association (HRA) or in groups in solidarity with certain prisoners such as TAYAD). With their help the prisoners tried to make their demands for improved prison conditions for which they frequently went on hunger strike (often also called death fast) public.

In April 1991 Law 3713 on Fighting Terrorism (called Anti-Terror-Law, ATL) was passed. Article 16 provided that all prisoners charged under this law had to be held in high security prisons.

Since 2000

In 1996 the political prisoners succeeded in their objection to be transferred to the first high security prison in Eskişehir (it was called "special type prison"). Their death fast resulted in the death of 12 prisoners. In 2000 a similar action against the high security prisons (now called F-type Prisons) was not successful, although the death toll was much higher. There are currently 13 F-type prisons (14, if the prison on İmralı Island is added) and two D-type prisons (also high security prisons). The prison population statistics show an immense rise from the year 2000 through 2016. In 2000, the combined number of imprisoned individuals was 49,512. In the year 2016, that number has increased to 200,339. On this date, the rate of incarceration was 285 prisoners per 100,000 Turkish residents. In November 2018, the total incarceration rate increased to 260,000 people. This number incorporates pre-trial convicts. The prison population rate is 318, this number is per 100,000 of the national population. An estimated national population of November 2018 is 81.68 million. The maximum space of the prison system is 220,000 possible detainees as of November 2018. As of November 2018, the occupancy level is at 118.2%.18.2% over capacity.

Facts and figures

According to the General Directorate for Penal and Arrest Centres (Ceza ve Tevkifevleri Genel Müdürlüğü, part of the Ministry of Justice) 384 prisons existed in Turkey as of 1 December 2008. 346 of them were closed and 28 were open prisons. In addition there were three closed and one open prison for women and three correctional centres for children. For the same date the number of prisoners was given as 103,296; among them 44,038 on remand and 59,258 convicts.

On the homepage of the General Directorate for Penal and Arrest Centres figures on prisoners can be found on the number of prisoners for each year. The Human Rights Foundation of Turkey has included such figures in their annual reports.

{| class="wikitable" 
| rowspan=2 |Year || colspan=3 align="center" | Convicted || colspan=3 align="center"  | On remand || rowspan=2 align="center" | Total
|-align="center" 
| Ordinary
| "Terror"
| Sum
| Ordinary
| "Terror"
| Sum
|-align="right" 
| 1990
| 27,731
| 1,642
| 29,373
| 14,488
| 1,745
| 16,233
| colspan="4" | 45,606
|-align="right" 
| 1991
| 10,652
| 395
| 11,047
| 14,760
| 1,044
| 15,804
| colspan="4" | 26,851
|-align="right" 
| 1992
| 12,301
| 522
| 12,823
| 15,597
| 3,062
| 18,659
| colspan="4" | 31,482
|-align="right" 
| 1993
| 14,300
| 847
| 15,147
| 14,681
| 4,977
| 19,658
| colspan="4" | 34,805
|-align="right" 
| 1994
| 15,787
| 1,094
| 16,881
| 15,638
| 6,412
| 22,050
| colspan="4" | 38,931
|-align="right" 
| 1995
| 20,371
| 1,637
| 22,008
| 17,058
| 7,025
| 24,083
| colspan="4" | 46,091
|-align="right" 
| 1996
| 24,651
| 2,328
| 26,979
| 17,697
| 6,207
| 23,904
| colspan="4" | 50,883
|-align="right" 
| 1997
| 32,155
| 4,179
| 36,334
| 19,346
| 4,926
| 24,272
| colspan="4" | 60,606
|-align="right" 
| 1998
| 31,647
| 4,239
| 35,886
| 19,670
| 4,835
| 24,505
| colspan="4" | 60,391
|-align="right" 
| 1999
| 37,986
| 6,145
| 44,131
| 19,953
| 3,497
| 23,450
| colspan="4" | 67,581
|-align="right" 
| 2000
| 20,378
| 4,467
| 24,855
| 20,467
| 4,190
| 24,657
| colspan="4" | 49,512
|-align="right" 
|2001
|22,425 
|5,116 
|27,541 
|24,886 
|3,182 
|28,068 
| colspan="4" | 55,609
|-align="right" 
|2002
|25,514 
|5,123 
|30,637 
|25,928 
|2,622 
|28,550 
| colspan="4" | 59,187
|-align="right" 
|2003
|28,554 
|4,161 
|32,715 
|29,605 
|1,976 
|31,581 
| colspan="4" | 64,296
|-align="right" 
|2004
|23,840
|2,170
|26,010
|30,302
|1,618
|31,920
| colspan="4" | 57,930
|-align="right" 
|2005
|22,765
|2,093
|24,858
|29,475
|1,537
|31,012
| colspan="4" | 55,870
|-align="right" 
|2006
|24,220
|2,116
|26,336
|42,222
|1,719
|44,141
| colspan="4" | 70,477
|-align="right" 
|2007 
|34,852 
|2,418 
|37,608 
|47,091 
|2,102 
|53,229 
| colspan="4" | 90,837
|-align="right" 
|2008 
|42,234 
|2,540 
|45,207 
|50,470 
|2,899 
|58,028 
| colspan="4" | 103,235
|-
|}

Meanwhile, the statistics also include the category "crimes to increase profit" (tr: çıkar amaçlı suçlar, meaning organized crime, punishable according to Article 220 of the Turkish Penal Code). Since 2010 the cases that could not be attributed to a specific group were also included.

{| class="wikitable"
| |Years
| colspan="5" |Convicted
| colspan="6" |On remand
|-
| ||Ordinary||Terror ||Organized ||Unclear||Sum ||Ordinary ||Terror ||Organized ||Unclear ||Sum||Total
|-
| 2009||53067||2967||547||||56581||52512||3361||3886||||59759||116340
|-
| 2010||80440||3682||993||1451||86566||29676||2535||1566||471||34238||120814
|-
| 2011||86542||4179||907||989||92617||29901||4266||1372||448||35987||128604
|}

On 31 January 2010 the official figures were:
{| class="wikitable" 
| rowspan=2 |Year || colspan=3 align="center" | Convicted || colspan=3 align="center"  | On remand || rowspan=2 align="center" | Total
|-align="center" 
| Ordinary
| "Terror"
| Sum
| Ordinary
| "Terror"
| Sum
|-align="right" 
| 2010
| 53,805
| 3,051
| 56,856
| 57,024
| 3,254
| 60,691
| colspan="4" | 117,547
|-
|}

The following figures were presented for 31 March 2012:

{| class="wikitable"
| | Group
| | On remand
| | Under review
| | Convicted
| | Total

|-
| | Ordinary
| | 29,890
| | 17,597
| | 72,022
| | 119.509

|-
| | Terror
| | 4,643
| | 481
| | 3,846
| | 8,970

|-
| |Organized crime
| | 1,283
| | 389
| | 522
| | 2,194

|-
| | Unspecified
| | 457
| | 42
| | 1,197
| | 1,696

|-
| | Total
| | 36.273
| | 18,509
| | 77,587
| | 132.369

|}

In June 2010 Justice Minister Sadullah Ergin answered a question tabled by Batman deputy Bengi Yıldız. He stated that between 2010 and 2015 a total of 86 new prisons with a capacity of 40.026 prisoners were to be built.

Prison types
Using the official material of the General Directorate for Penal and Arrest Centres the Democratic Turkey Forum prepared a table on prisons in Turkey as of October 2008. Further details have been included as "particulars".

{| class="wikitable" 
| align="center" style="background:#f0f0f0;"|Type
| align="center" style="background:#f0f0f0;"|Number
| align="center" style="background:#f0f0f0;"|Capacity (single)
| align="center" style="background:#f0f0f0;"|Capacity (complete)
| align="center" style="background:#f0f0f0;"|Particulars
|-
| A||21||24-30||792||Prisons built in district between the 1950s and 1970s. There are 4 wards (koğuş), bathroom, kitchen, library and a conference hall.
|-
| A1||16||24-40||508||Further to type A: there are two cells and room next to the wards that can be used as a kitchen. 
|-
| A2||17||40||744||5 wards and 2 disciplinary cells.
|-
| A3||31||60||2,295||6 wards.
|-
| B||16||64||1,068||7 wards and 2 disciplinary cells; each ward has its own exercise yard (havalandırma). 
|-
| C||7||164-300||1,696||8 wards and 4 disciplinary cells.
|-
| D||2||750||1,732||11 blocks, one block for administration; 230 rooms (cells). Block E is for communal use (laundry, library etc.). The lower floors of block H and L consist of disciplinary cells. The first and second floor of block G have 10 rooms each for observation (müşahade) on arrival. This block also has two infirmaries with 10 beds each. These prisons are built on the system of individual cells and cells for three people.
|-
| E ||45||600-1,000||29,753||Built on two floors based on the ward (koğuş) system and later changed to rooms for 2, 4, 6, 8 and 10 persons. Each room has its own exercise yard. The lower floors are for eating; the upper floors are the dormitories.
|-
| F||13||368||4,966||See F-type Prisons (Turkey)
|-
| H||5||500||3,255||Built on two floors on the room (cell) system. There are 200 individual cells and 100 cells for 3 persons. 
|-
| K1||83||60||3553||They are found in districts with 4 wards and 2 disciplinary cells. Each ward has its own exercise yard. 
|-
| K2||24||60-150||1,446||Like type K1 with 6 wards and 2 disciplinary cells. 
|-
| L||16||||15,084||Closed prisons, built in big cities in place of old prisons. Cells are closed at night; during the day 7 prisoners are together. There are 61 units for 7 people, 4 rooms for 3 people and 40 individual cells. 
|-
| M||24||||9,107||These prisons that were built on two floors in the ward system, cells for 4, 6, 8, 10 people were made. Each room has its own exercise yard. The prisons have 6 disciplinary cells.
|-
| T ||4||616||6,277||They were built in big cities in place of old prisons. There are 72 rooms for 8 prisoners, 8 rooms for 3 prisoners and 16 individual cells of 16 sqm. The (living and sleeping) room for 3 people measures . The sports hall measures  and outside . There is space for 450 people during open visits and 36 people for closed visits. Room for 32 lawyers meeting their clients exists.
|-
| F(o)||1||350||350||open prison for women
|-
| F(c)||Paşakapısı||||||closed prison for women; Paşakapısı and Bakırköy are in Istanbul
|-
| ||Bakırköy||506||||construction started in 2008; 38 units for 12 people each; 2 units for 3 people and 44 individual cells.
|-
| ||Sincan||352||||District close to Ankara, 24 units for 12 people each, 12 units for 3 people each, 28 individual cells.
|-
| K(c)||3||||366||closed prison for children
|-
| K(e)||3||100-250||360||education centre for children; juveniles aged 12 to 18 are held here. In case an education was continuing at the age of 18 permission can be given to stay longer (up to the age of 21). 
|-
| (c)||23||||6,277||
|-
| (o)||28||||6,405||
|-
| (o)||38||||2,617||
|-
|}

Comments of international institutions 
Besides NGOs such as Amnesty International or Human Rights Watch the European Committee for the Prevention of Torture and Inhuman or Degrading Treatment or Punishment (CPT) has frequently dealt with the situation in Turkish prisons. A major concern were the F-type prisons, the high security prisons that the CPT encouraged Turkey to build. and the situation on the island İmralı, where Abdullah Öcalan has been the only prisoner since 1999.

On 6 March 2008 a report was published on a visit to the island between 19 and 22 May 2007. This was the fourth visit. In conclusion the CPT said (in para 31.): Abdullah Öcalan has now been imprisoned, as the sole inmate of the High-Security Closed Prison of Imralı - an island which is difficult to reach - for almost eight and a half years. Although the situation of indisputable isolation to which the prisoner has been subjected since 16 February 1999 has had adverse effects over the years, the CPT's previous visits had not revealed significant harmful consequences for his physical and psychological condition. This assessment must now be revised, in the light of the evolution of Abdullah Öcalan's physical and mental condition."

During visits to other facilities the CPT marked certain shortcomings. The report of 8 December 2005 (on a visit in 2004), for instance, included the following recommendations:

 staff at Izmir (Buca) Closed Prison and the E-type prisons in Aydın and Gaziantep to be given a firm reminder that the ill-treatment of inmates is not acceptable and will be the subject of severe sanctions; it should be made clear to them that prisoners who breach discipline must be dealt with exclusively in accordance with existing disciplinary procedures and that any form of unofficial punishment will not be tolerated (paragraph 50).
 the Turkish authorities to take all necessary steps to develop the communal activity programmes at Izmir F-type Prison No. 1, in terms of both the range of activities on offer and the number of prisoners engaging in those activities; in this connection, the remarks made in paragraphs 57 and 58 to be taken fully into account (paragraph 59);
 immediate steps to be taken to ensure that every prisoner at Aydın and Gaziantep E-type Prisons has his/her own bed (paragraph 63);
 the necessary steps to be taken to ensure that occupancy rates in all prisoner accommodation units at Aydın and Gaziantep E-type Prisons are of a reasonable level (paragraph 63);
 the level of hygiene in prisoner accommodation areas at Gaziantep E-type Prison to be reviewed (paragraph 63).

See also
 List of prisons in Turkey
 2016–present purges in Turkey
 Midnight Express (film), a 1978 film about an American student's incarceration in a Turkish prison

References

External links
 Website of the General Directorate for Prisons (Turkish)
 CPT on Turkey 
 Democratic Turkey Forum Daily, weekly and special reports on human rights in Turkey in German, English and Turkish
 MrZine-Monthly Review An article on the prison population and conditions in Turkey
 Inside Erdogan’s Prisons